The Berenstain Bears is a children's animated television comedy series based on the children's book series of the same name by Stan and Jan Berenstain. Acting as a remake of the 1985–1987 cartoon series of the same name, the series follows the lives of a family of anthropomorphic bears who learn a moral or safety-related lesson during the course of each episode. The series premiered on PBS Kids on January 6, 2003. A total of 40 episodes were produced, with the series airing until September 10, 2004.

Synopsis
The series is set in a world populated only by anthropomorphic bears and primarily centers around the Berenstain Bears. The Berenstain Bears are a family residing in the rural community of Bear Country consisting of Mama Bear, Papa Q. Bear, Brother Bear, and Sister Bear. Although a numerous episodes are based on the books and promote the same morals as encouraged in the picture books from which their plots originated, the program's faithfulness to the original series is slightly mixed on account of a number of later episodes following original storylines. Nonetheless, they mostly portray the same environment depicted in the original Berenstain Bears storybooks quite accurately and concentrate on the messages and lessons learned by the family through their different experiences, such as generosity and responsibility, as well as the daily lives of the bears.

Episodes

Voice cast

Main
 Michael Cera (seasons 1–2) and Michael D'Ascenzo (season 3) as Brother
 Tajja Isen as Sister
 Benedict Campbell as Papa
 Camilla Scott as Mama

Recurring

Family
 Leslie Carlson as Grizzly Gramps 
 Corinne Conley as Grizzly Gran
 Marc McMulkin as Cousin Fred

Friends
 Amanda Soha as Lizzy Bruin
 Nikki Marshall as Queenie
 Mark Rendall as Ferdy Factual
 Gage Knox as Too-Tall
 Patrick Salvagna as Skuzz
 James Eckhouse as Smirk
 Maryke Hendrikse as Hillary

Citizens
 Chris Wiggins as Squire Grizzly
 Ellen-Ray Hennessy as Miss Grizzle
 Philip Williams as Farmer Ben

Production
The show was produced by the Canada-based animation studio Nelvana for PBS Kids in the United States and Treehouse TV in Canada. 80 15-minute episodes were produced, adapted from the books and also a few new stories as well, similar to the 1985 production. However, due to Canadian laws requiring Nelvana to employ Canadian writers and artists, the Berenstains' involvement in the program was limited; they sought to exert their influence on some details, according to Stan: "Our bears don't wear shoes, and Papa wouldn't wear his hat in the house...And we try to keep complete, total banality out of the stories". Common practicalities of animation did force some minor costume changes from the books, such as eliminating polka dots and plaids (this issue also occurred in the previous animated series and specials and only a limited amount of polka dots was allowed in the five specials). The series is supposed to supplement the 1985 series because new books were released since then, even though the two series have a radically different production style as well as a change of in-universe elements. Another issue is the two series are not seen together.

Music
Country music singer-songwriter Lee Ann Womack performed the theme song written by Stan Meissner for the series.

Broadcast
It debuted in the United States on PBS Kids on January 6, 2003. Originally, it aired together with Seven Little Monsters but the two shows were eventually separated. Reruns aired on PBS Kids Sprout (later known as simply Sprout) from its inception up until the channel rebranded into Universal Kids on September 9, 2017, after Sprout's rights to air the series expired.

Accolades

References

External links

 

2000s Canadian animated television series
2000s Canadian children's television series
2003 Canadian television series debuts
2004 Canadian television series endings
Canadian children's animated comedy television series
Canadian preschool education television series
Canadian television shows based on children's books
Canadian television series with live action and animation
English-language television shows
2003 TV
PBS original programming
PBS Kids shows
Treehouse TV original programming
YTV (Canadian TV channel) original programming
Animated television series about bears
Animated television series about children
Animated television series about families
Animated television series about siblings
Television series by Nelvana
Television series by Corus Entertainment
Animated preschool education television series
2000s preschool education television series